Quadrastichus erythrinae Kim, 2004, (quadra=four, stichus=line, erythrinae=of erythrina) is a small parasitoid wasp belonging to the family Eulophidae, but also a secondary phytophage by way of inducing galls on the leaves, stems, petioles and young shoots of various Erythrina species.

Q. erythrinae was identified in 2004 in Erythrina galls collected in Singapore, Mauritius and Réunion. Eurytoma is a genus of wasps belonging to the family Eurytomidae of which some are parasitoids of Quadrastichus species; a parasitoid from the Eulophidae is Aprostocetus exertus.

The worldwide spread of Erythrina gall wasp (EGW) stem from a location in East Africa. Erythrina gall wasp have become an invasive species in Hawaii, overall threatening Hawaii's biodiversity. It was first observed on the island of Oahu and later spread amongst other neighboring islands with major infestations on endemic Erythrina sandwicensis and introduced E. variegata. It was then treated with parasitoid Eurytoma erythrinae, which proved to be very effective in reducing the population of Erythrina gall wasps.

References

External links
Quadrastichus erythrinae image

Eulophidae